Marks v. United States, 430 U.S. 188 (1977), is a case decided by the Supreme Court of the United States that explained how the holding of a case should be viewed where there is no majority supporting the rationale of any opinion.

Background
Petitioners were charged with several counts of transporting obscene materials in interstate commerce, and conspiracy to transport such materials. The conduct that gave rise to the charges covered a period through February 27, 1973, but the trial did not begin until the following October. In the interim, on June 21, 1973, the Supreme Court decided Miller v. California which announced new standards for isolating "hard core" pornography from expression protected by the First Amendment, the third test of which was "whether the work, taken as a whole, lacks serious literary, artistic, political, or scientific value". Petitioners argued in the District Court that they were entitled to jury instructions not under Miller, but under the more favorable formulation of Memoirs v. Massachusetts that expressive material is constitutionally protected unless it is "utterly without redeeming social value."

The Court noted that the Constitution's Ex Post Facto Clause is a limitation upon the powers of the Legislature, and does not of its own force apply to the Judicial Branch of government. But the principle on which the clause is based—the notion that persons have a right to fair warning of that conduct which will give rise to criminal penalties—is fundamental to our concept of constitutional liberty.

Petitioners asserted that Miller unforeseeably expanded the reach of the federal obscenity statutes beyond what was punishable under Memoirs. The Court of Appeals rejected this argument, noting that the Memoirs standards never commanded the assent of more than three Justices at any one time, and apparently concluded from this fact that Memoirs never became the law, and therefore the "contemporary community standards" test from the 1957 Roth v. United States applied, which was arguably at least as strict than the Memoirs test.

Opinion of the Court
The Court rejected the Petitioners' line of reasoning, stating that when a fragmented Court decides a case and no single rationale explaining the result enjoys the assent of five Justices, "the holding of the Court may be viewed as that position taken by those members who concurred in the judgments on the narrowest grounds . . . ."Gregg v. Georgia,  (opinion of Stewart, Powell and Stevens). Three Justices joined in the controlling opinion in Memoirs. Two others, Justice Black and Justice Douglas, concurred on broader grounds in reversing the judgment below. They reiterated their well-known position that the First Amendment provides an absolute shield against governmental action aimed at suppressing obscenity. Justice Stewart also concurred in the judgment, based on his view that only "hardcore pornography" may be suppressed. The view of the Memoirs plurality therefore constituted the holding of the Court and provided the governing standards at the time the alleged crimes were committed. Miller marked a significant departure from Memoirs and there can be little doubt that the third test announced in Miller expanded criminal liability. Since the petitioners were indicted for conduct occurring prior to the Court's decision in Miller, the Court found they are entitled to jury instructions requiring the jury to acquit unless it finds that the materials involved are "utterly without redeeming social value."

See also
Plurality opinion

References

External links
 

United States Supreme Court cases
United States Supreme Court cases of the Rehnquist Court
1977 in United States case law
United States obscenity case law